Mechtildis of Edelstetten, also known as Mechtildis of Diessen or Mechtildis of Andechs, was a Benedictine abbess and, according to legend, a renowned miracle worker. Mechtildis was the  daughter of Count Berthold of Andechs, whose wife, Sophie, founded a monastery on their estate at Diessen, Bavaria, and placed their daughter there at the age of five. In 1153, the Bishop of Augsburg placed her as Abbess of Edelstetten Abbey. Mechtildis was known for her mystical gifts and miracles. She died at Diessen, Germany, on 31 May 1160. Her adorned remains lie in a glass shrine within the Marienmünster church of that town.

Notes

German Roman Catholic saints
12th-century Christian saints
1160 deaths
Benedictine abbesses
Year of birth unknown
Christian female saints of the Middle Ages